Surgical stress is the systemic response to surgical injury and is characterized by activation of the sympathetic nervous system, endocrine responses as well as immunological and haematological changes. Measurement of surgical stress is used in anaesthesia, physiology and surgery.

Analysis of the surgical stress response can be used for evaluation of surgical techniques and comparisons of different anaesthetic protocols. Moreover, they can be performed both in the intraoperative or postoperative period.
If there is a choice between different techniques for a surgical procedure, one method to evaluate and compare the surgical techniques is to subject one group of patients to one technique, and the other group of patients to another technique, after which the surgical stress responses triggered by the procedures are compared. Absent any other difference, the technique with the least surgical stress response is considered the best for the patient.

Similarly, a group of patients can be subjected to a surgical procedure where one anaesthetic protocol is used, and another group of patients are subjected to the same surgical procedure but with a different anaesthetic protocol. The anaesthetic protocol that yields the least stress response is considered the most suitable for that surgical procedure.

It is generally considered or hypothesized that a more invasive surgery, with extensive tissue trauma and noxious stimuli, triggers a more significant stress response.

However, duration of surgery may affect the stress response which therefore may make comparisons of procedures that differ in time difficult.


Methods 

Examples of used parameters are blood pressure, heart rate, heart rate variability, photoplethysmography and skin conductance. Essentially, physiologic parameters are measured in order to assess sympathetic tone as a surrogate measure of stress. Intraoperative neurophysiological monitoring can also be used.
Examples of commonly used biomarkers are adrenaline, cortisol, interleukins, noradrenaline and vasopressin.

History 

Loss of nitrogen (urea) was observed already in the 1930s in fracture patients by the Scottish physician David Cuthbertson. The reason for the patients' catabolic response was not understood at the time, but later attention was turned to the stress reaction caused by the surgery. 
The evolutionary background is believed to be that a wounded animal increases its chance of survival by using stored energy reserves. The stress reaction thus initiates a catabolic state by an increased release of catabolic hormones. Additionally immunosuppressive hormones are also released.
In a surgery patient, the stress reaction is considered detrimental for wound healing. However, surgical stress reduced mortality from endotoxin shock. Today, development of new surgical techniques and anaesthetic protocols aim to minimise the surgical stress reaction.

References 

Stress (biology)

Anesthesia